Giulio Cesare Amidano (c. 1560s – c. 1630) was an Italian painter of the late-Renaissance style. He was also known as Pomponio Amidano, in part because he is either confused with or was a pupil of Pomponio Allegri; others claim he was a pupil of Francesco Mazzola (Parmigianino). Much of his biography is poorly documented. He is said to have been born in Parma and to have died there from the plague.

References

1560s births
1630 deaths
16th-century Italian painters
Italian male painters
17th-century Italian painters
Painters from Parma
Renaissance painters